Pedal Car Racing is a circuit racing endurance sport where teams of up to six drivers race single-seater human powered sports cars in races of up to twenty-four hours in length. Four team members share the driving (increasing to six in 24 hour races), with each completing as many laps as he or she can before handing over to the next driver. Therefore, the races are very similar in style and tactics to endurance sports car races across the world.

Racing pedal cars
The cars are mainly sports prototypes built by or for the teams that race them. There are no commercial suppliers of racing pedal cars in the UK, although Karbyk in Italy make racing pedal cars commercially. 

All cars must comply with the international pedal car specification, but the formula is flexible enough such that the cars are as varied as the teams who race them, with many different solutions to the same problem.

Classes
There are Eight classes in pedal car racing all sharing circuit space. They aim to ensure the safe lapping of back markers by making it a skill that faster drivers must acquire.

British Pedal Car Championship
First run in 1998, the British Pedal Car Championship is a series of endurance pedal car races which runs between late March/Early April and September/October every year in the UK. Typically, there are 7 or 8 races totaling just over 60 racing hours including the Shenington 24 hour race in June (at which double points are awarded).

The championship has evolved into 7 or 8 rounds from its early days (see History) and is now held at mostly Kart tracks around the country, usually starting at Wombwell and ending at Curborough, with the prestige 24Hr race held in June at Shenington.

The usual Championship format is as follows, but it can vary due to track availability

Round 1 - March/April - Sprints - Wombwell

Round 2 - April/May - 6Hr Race - Evesham 

Round 3 - June/July 24 Hr Race - Shenington

Round 5 - Sept - Sprints - Blackbushe

Round 6 - Sept - 100 Mile - Blackbushe

Round 7 - Sept/Oct 7Hr Race - Curborough

The championship is organised and run by the British Federation of Pedal Car Racing

History 
The history of pedalcar races can be traced back to the time that American Scouts were staging their first Soap Box Derby, it occurred to Haydn Dimmock, then editor of 'The Scout' magazine, that a similar event might be arranged in Britain but whereas the American cars were Gravity Racers ours would be pedal powered.

Our races grew from the National ScoutCar races which started in 1939 and resumed after the war in 1950 with several large scale races. There is also evidence of a 24Hr race in 1968 as captured on film by British Pathe.

At some point separate races were set up independent of the Scouts but using very similar cars, it is possible that it was just a group of friends deciding that they wanted more races and having outgrown Scouts set up a series of races in a championship around the UK.

During the 1980s the sport had evolved into as series of 4 24 hour races at various locations around the country. 1 each in the North, South, East and West.

The top half dozen cars from each of these races were then invited to a "final" 24 hour race which we believe took place in Milton Keynes.

By the early 1990s this had come to an end and the season comprised around 4 – 6 races including 24 hour events at Scunthorpe and Bolton, a sprint event at Wolverhampton and, also at Wolverhampton, a weekend event which comprised various "trials" followed by an endurance race.

The 1990s saw the events decline such that by 1996 the sport was down to 4 events – 2 of which took place on a car park in Rugby…

Matters came to a head in 1997 with the cancellation of the National Championships at very short notice and the unwillingness of the management of the sport to take any initiative to increase participation.

However, over the winter of 1997 – 1998 a new committee was formed, new events were organised and what could be described as the 1st race weekend of the "modern era" took place over 28 – 29 March at the Transport Research Laboratory test track, near Wokingham.

Since then with a major push in the 2000s new teams have entered, new rounds have been added and the championship stands as it is today.

The Shenington 24 hour race
The Shenington 24 hour race takes place at Shenington Kart Track near Banbury, UK at the end of June and is the flagship event of the British Pedal Car Championship. The race comprises a night practice session on Friday and then the race starts at midday Saturday. Six drivers are allowed per car and all cars must carry head and tail lights for night racing.

The 2013 edition was won by BAR racing in a car designed and built by Formula 1 engineer, the late Gary "Gadget" North.

In 2014, Apollo Racing took the win just ahead of championship rivals Wing Racers and cycling club Rugby Velo.

So far, a cycling club has not won the Shenington 24 hour race despite entries from Winchcombe Wheelers, Team JMC, Rugby Velo, Treads CC, Cranks and Simonstrong Media-Velo in recent years.

www.shenington24.com

2020 Racing Calendar

Due to the Covid-19 pandemic all rounds were cancelled. A trial day was held at Blackbushe on 4 September 2020 to test Covid secure protocols and it was deemed a success. Round 6 at Curborough was due to take place on 3 October 2020 but due to Storm Alex bringing a lot of rain, it was cancelled.

2021 Racing Calendar

We hope with the covid vaccine and continuance of our covid secure protocols to run a full 2021 calendar as follows

Round 1 – Wombwell – Sunday 28 March (Format t.b.c.)

Round 2 – Kinsham Raceway – Saturday 8 May 6 hours (afternoon start)

Round 3 – Shenington – 25 – 27 June 24 hours (midday Saturday start)

Round 4 – Blackbushe – Saturday 4 September Sprints

Round 5 – Blackbushe – Sunday 5 September 100 miles

Round 6 – Curborough Saturday 2 October 150 miles (day / night)

Link to details of pedal car races in the UK

BFPCR Championship Winners 2020

Due to Covid there was no 2020 Championship.

BFPCR Championship Winners 2019
Here is listed the winners in each class from the last championship year, for further years please look results page of website

http://pedalcarracing.info/championship-points/

2019 PC1 Open

2019 PCA Under 18

2019 PC2 Under 16

2019 PC3 Under 14

2019 PC4 Under 12

2019 PCF Female

2019 PCD Duo

2019 PC0 Solo

References

Human-powered vehicles
Racing